Burhan is an Arabic male name, an epithet of the Islamic Prophet Muhammad. It is especially popular in Turkey, as it respects Turkish vowel harmony and the end syllable "-han" can be interpreted as the Turkish variant of "Khan".

Origin

Given name
 Burhan Ali, self-declared Shah of Shirvan
 Burhan Nizam Shah II (ruled 1591–1595), the ruler of Ahmadnagar in the Deccan
 Buran bint al-Hasan ibn Sahl, wife of Abbasid caliph al-Ma'mun (r. 813–833)
 Burhan G (born 1983), Danish R&B and pop singer, songwriter and producer of Kurdish-Turkish origin
 Burhan Alankuş (born 1950), Turkish alpine skier
 Burhan Atak (1905–1987), Turkish footballer
 Burhan Asaf Belge (1899–1967), served as the representative of Muğla province during the 11th term of Turkish National Assembly
 Burhan Al-Chalabi (born 1947), British-Iraqi writer and political commentator
 Burhan Conkeroğlu (1903–2001), Turkish wrestler
 Burhan Doğançay (born 1929), Turkish-American painter and photographer
 Burhan Eşer, Turkish footballer
 Burhan Ghalioun (born 1945), French Syrian professor of sociology
 Burhan Imad Shah, an infant ruler of Berar
 Burhan Kuzu (1955–2020), Turkish academic and politician
 Burhan Muhammad (1957–2015), Indonesian diplomat
 Burhan Qurbani (born 1980), Afghan-German film director, writer and actor of Hazara origin
 Burhan Sahyouni (born 1986), Syrian footballer
 Burhan Sargun (born 1929), Turkish footballer
 Burhan Shahidi (1894–1989), political leader in Xinjiang, China
 Burhan Sönmez, Turkish novelist
 Burhan Wani (1994–2016), was the chief commander of a Kashmiri militant group Hizbul Mujahideen

Burhanullah
 Burhanullah Shinwari, deputy chairman of the upper house of Afghanistan's legislature

Burhanuddin
 Ghazi Burhanuddin, first Muslim resident of Sylhet
 Burhanuddin Awliya(Garib) (21 chisti from in order) a Sufi (wali)and a islamic scholar resting in khuldabad Shareef (Having a big shrine) in Aurangabad also known as Rauza in Maharashtra India. Record available in British library too.

Surname
 Mohamed Burhan (1903-??), Turkish sprinter
 Mohan Niranjit Burhan, a judge of the Supreme Court of Seychelles
 Qasem Burhan (born 1985), Qatari footballer from Al Gharrafa
 Rahim Burhan (born 1949), Macedonian theatre director

Tribal name
 Burhan (Pashtun tribe), a tribe of Afghanistan

See also
 Burhan (disambiguation)
 Arabic name
 Borhani
 Burhan al-Din (disambiguation)
 Burkhan (disambiguation)

References

Arabic-language surnames
Arabic masculine given names
Bosniak masculine given names
Turkish masculine given names
Urdu masculine given names